The awards were announced by minister Thiruvanchoor Radhakrishnan in Thiruvananthapuram on 1 March 2016. The winners in the fiction category were selected by a jury headed by veteran filmmaker Mohan. The other jury members were George Kithu, M.A Venu, Sulakshana, Sharath, B R Prasad, Venugopal, Premchand, Dr Soman, and C.R Rajamohan. The jury for nonfiction category consisted of Rajeev Gopalakrishnan, Pavitran, C.R Rajamohan, and was headed by S. Jayachandran Nair. The J. C. Daniel Award was awarded to K. G. George. The awards were presented on 15 October 2016.

Winners 

Most Awards

References

External links 
 http://www.keralafilm.com

Kerala State Film Awards
2015 Indian film awards